The Tonopah and Goldfield Railroad, a railroad of  in length in the U.S. state of Nevada, offered point-to-point service between Mina and Goldfield, running over the Excelsior Mountains and parallel to the Monte Cristo Range.  It operated from 1905 until 1947.

Corporate history

Growth
Predecessors of the Tonopah and Goldfield (T&G) Railroad, including the Tonopah Railroad, began operations in 1903.  The decade of the 1900s was a period of frenzied railroad-building in southwestern Nevada, with rich silver ore discovered at Tonopah in 1900 and gold-bearing quartz at Goldfield in 1902.  In addition, silver was struck at Silver Peak.  As the entire region was then served by nothing but stagecoaches, an infrastructure was quickly begun to serve what was a fast-growing network of precious-metal mines and miners.  The first predecessor of the Tonopah and Goldfield Railroad, the Tonopah Railroad (built 1903-1904), was a  narrow gauge line from what was then called Sodaville Junction ( south of Mina) to Tonopah.  This spur line merged with the Goldfield Railroad in November 1905 to create the Tonopah and Goldfield Railroad, and the merged rail line would continue to do business under this corporate name until ceasing operations in 1947.

Investment money poured into the new gold fields, with the merged Tonopah and Goldfield Railroad claiming to have $2,150,000 in equity capital. The merged railroad also relaid its existing tracks to become a standard gauge road.

With the gold and silver mines in full production, the Tonopah and Goldfield soon had competition from the Las Vegas and Tonopah Railroad and the Tonopah and Tidewater Railroad. In addition, the Bullfrog Goldfield Railroad built some right-of-way and leased out its trackage rights to operating railroads. The Tonopah and Goldfield held a brief strategic advantage over its competitors: its northern railhead at Mina was a junction point with the Nevada and California Railroad (N&C), an affiliate line of one of the largest railroads in the West, the Southern Pacific. This made it possible for passengers from the East or West Coasts to travel to the northern end of the Nevada and California spur line by fast Pullman service; the final leg of the journey, from the Southern Pacific main line at Hazen, Nevada over the N&C and T&G to Goldfield, was however very slow.

Decline
Gold production in the Esmeralda district peaked only a few years after the first discoveries of precious metal, with declines seen as early as 1911 and continuing thereafter.  The weaker railroad lines began to crumble, with the Las Vegas and Tonopah ceasing operations in 1918 and the Bullfrog Goldfield in 1928.

By the 1920s, rubber-tired vehicles had come to Nevada.  The Tonopah and Goldfield tried to meet this threat by cutting back their steam engine service.  By 1931 the train's departure on five of the seven days of each week was not a steam train, but a motor train.  Two or three weekly steam trains continued to run; the engines also pulled freight cars to serve the needs of the district's residual goods traffic.

The Great Depression in 1929-1940, and the departure of the United States from the gold standard in 1933, further depressed conditions in the Esmeralda district; the T&G operated under receivership in 1932-1937, and the Tonopah and Tidewater, less resilient, gave up the ghost in 1940.

During the World War II years, with gasoline rationing starting in 1942, the T&G was the only means of ingress and egress for many of the remaining ranchers and miners of southwestern Nevada.  In addition, the railroad carried traffic to and from the wartime Tonopah Army Air Field (1942–45).  A 1943 printed schedule indicates that during its final years of operation the railroad, although it continued to operate an office in Tonopah, appears to have been controlled by Seattle capital, and the railroad was managed from there.

With the reappearance of gasoline and shutdown of the army airfield in late 1945, the Tonopah and Goldfield was quickly faced with lethal business conditions.  The short line permanently ceased operations in October 1947.  By 2010, only bleached railroad ties marked the route of the once-pioneering line.

A few boxcars, a passenger car body and some old automobiles converted to run on T&G railway tracks currently survive at Goldfield, Nevada, and a boxcar from the narrow-gauge days is now at the Laws Railroad Museum. The Nevada State Railroad Museum is also in the possession of an old combine car body, caboose and former motorcar from the T&G.

See also
Bullfrog Goldfield Railroad
Carson and Colorado Railway
Las Vegas and Tonopah Railroad
Tonopah and Tidewater Railroad
List of defunct Nevada railroads

References

External links

 

Defunct Nevada railroads
History of Esmeralda County, Nevada
History of Mineral County, Nevada
History of Nye County, Nevada
Tonopah, Nevada
Railway companies established in 1905
Railway companies disestablished in 1947
1905 establishments in Nevada
1947 disestablishments in Nevada